Jeneponto Regency is a regency of South Sulawesi Province of Indonesia. It covers the south coast of the southern peninsula of Sulawesi, with a total area of 749.79 km2 and a population of 342,222 at the 2010 Census and 401,610 at the 2020 Census. The official estimate for mid 2021 was 405,508. The principal town lies at Bontosunggu. The northern part of the regency (including an inland salient towards the northeast forming Rumbia District) consists of a plateau with an altitude of 500 to 1400 metres above sea level, the middle part has an altitude of 100 to 500 metres, while the south includes lowland areas with an altitude of 0 to 150 metres, including a coastline of 114 km on the Flores Sea.

Administrative Districts 
Jeneponto Regency is divided into eleven Districts (Kecamatan), tabulated below with their areas and their populations at the 2010 Census and 2020 Census, together with the official estimates for mid 2021. The table also includes the locations of the district administrative centres, the numbers of villages in each district (totalling 82 rural desa and 31 urban kelurahan), and its post code(s).

Note: (a) except the 3 desa of Jenetallasa (post code 92314), Loka (post code 92516) and Bontotiro (post code 92572).

References

Regencies of South Sulawesi